Peter Corbett (24 August 1940 – 23 May 2015) was a South African cricketer. He played in 40 first-class cricket for Natal, North Eastern Transvaal and Transvaal from 1958/59 to 1968/69.

References

External links
 

1940 births
2015 deaths
South African cricketers
KwaZulu-Natal cricketers
Northerns cricketers
Gauteng cricketers
People from Vryburg